CSM Ploiești is a men's handball club from Ploiești, Romania, that plays in the Divizia A, second tier of the Romanian handball league system.

External links
Official Website 

Ploiești (men's handball)
Handball clubs established in 2004
2004 establishments in Romania
Sport in Ploiești